Robert Kay may refer to:

 Robert Kay (footballer), English footballer
 Robert Kay (inventor) (1728–1802), English inventor of a device to improve weaving on looms
 Robert Kay (librarian) (1825–1904), director of South Australian Library, Museum and Art Gallery
 Robert Kay (politician) (1869–1947), English solicitor and politician
 Robert E. Kay (1916–1990), Republican senator from New Jersey